The Congress of People (COP) is a registered, unrecognised political party in India.

See also
 Politics of India
 List of political parties in India

References

Indian nationalist political parties